Skinner's Dress Suit may refer to:
 Skinner's Dress Suit (1926 film), an American silent comedy film
 Skinner's Dress Suit (1917 film), an American silent comedy film